Mats Michael Hinze (born 22 September 1970), also known as The Olympic bomber, is a Swedish Right-wing anarchist who was caught carrying a backpack containing explosives by Millesgården in 1997.

Political career
Hinze was born in Täby, Sweden and was an active member of the neo-liberal organization Frihetsfronten and was involved in the operation of the illegal club Tritnaha run by the organization. In 1995, he founded the techno club Docklands in cooperation with Anders Varveus. The club was subject to harassment from Swedish authorities and police due to claims that it was part in spreading illegal narcotics. To take revenge on the Swedish authorities, Hinze planned the bombing of Millesgården. It was aimed at crippling Stockholm's attempt at hosting the 2004 Olympic games. The man and Pegasus sculpture located at Millesgården was a symbol of Sweden's attempt to host the 2004 Olympic games.

The bomb
Hinze claimed that he never intended to detonate the bomb and that his goal was to humiliate the Swedish police. Hinze was also suspect in other acts of vandalization and destruction related to the 2004 Olympics (among them the Lidingö tennishall arson). However, the police were only able to tie him to the tennis hall arson and the Millesgården incident. In 1998, the Svea Court of Appeal sentenced Hinze to seven years imprisonment for planning to bomb Millesgården as well as the tennis hall arson. He was released in 2002 and has since changed his name.

In 2004, Hinze translated the book The Adventures of Jonathan Gullible: A Free Market Odyssey to Swedish.

References

Literature

External links
 Intervju med Mats Hinze
 Docklands - historien om ravekultur, knark och en OS-bomb, P3 Dokumentär

1970 births
Living people
Swedish anarchists
Swedish criminals